Hapkeite is a mineral discovered in the Dhofar 280 meteorite found in 2000 in Oman on the Arabian peninsula. The meteorite is believed to originate from the Moon; specifically, it appears to be a fragment of lunar highland breccia. Hapkeite's composition is of silicon and iron, and it is similar to other silicon-iron minerals found on Earth. An impact on the Moon is thought to have launched the partially molten or vaporized material into orbit. 

Due to its 1:2 composition of silicon-iron, hapkeite was given the chemical formula Fe2Si. It occurs as opaque, yellowish to silvery microscopic isometric crystals.

It is named after Bruce Hapke, who predicted the presence and importance of vapor-deposited coatings on lunar soil grains (space weathering).

Beside hapkeite, other natural iron silicide minerals include gupeiite, naqite, linzhiite, luobusaite, suessite, xifengite, and zangboite.

See also
 Glossary of meteoritics
List of minerals
List of minerals named after people

References

Space weathering on airless planetary bodies: Clues from the lunar mineral hapkeite 2004 PNAS

Iron(II) minerals
Meteorite minerals
Cubic minerals
Minerals in space group 221
Native element minerals